Crown jewels are precious regalia used in the coronation of a monarch

Crown jewels or Crown Jewels may also refer to:
 The Crown Jewels (box set), eight-album box set by the rock group Queen 
 Crown Jewels (film), 1950 West German crime film 
 The Crown Jewels (film), a 2011 Swedish drama
 MS Cunard Crown Jewel, cruise ship
 Crown Jewel Defense, when a company divests its most attractive assets to discourage a hostile takeover
 Crown jewels of British sport, which must be broadcast on free-to-air television
 Ironstone's Crown Jewel, the world's largest piece of crystalline gold
 "The crown jewels", nickname for documents leaked by Clive Ponting in 1984
 WWE Crown Jewel, a professional wrestling pay-per-view series
 Crown Jewel (2018)
 Crown Jewel (2019)
 Crown Jewel (2021)
 The Crown Jewels (novel), a 1987 novel by Walter Jon Williams

See also
 The Jewel in the Crown (disambiguation)